Legal mobilisation is a tool available to paralegal and advocacy groups, to achieve legal empowerment by supporting a marginalized issues of a stakeholder, in negotiating with the other concerned agencies and other stakeholders, by strategic combined use of legal processes along with advocacy, media engagement and social mobilisation. As per Frances Kahen Zemans (1983)  the Legal mobilisation is "a desire or want, which is translated into a demand as an assertion of one's rights". 

According to Lisa Vanhala (November 2011) Legal mobilisation in its  narrowest sense, may refer to high-profile litigation efforts for (or, arguably, against) social change or more broadly, term legal mobilisation has been used to describe any type of process by which an individual or collective actors invoke legal norms, discourse, or symbols to influence policy or behavior. This typically means that there are policies or regulations to mobilize around and a mechanism by which to do so. Legislative activity does create an opportunity for legal mobilization. The courts become particularly relevant when petitioners have grounds to file suit.

History of conceptualisation
The use of the law and legal systems by disadvantaged people to contest the unfair distribution of power and resources is a real-world phenomenon that predates and exists independently of international law and justice assistance.

study and research

Tool to ensure statutory intervention
Particularly in circumstances where traditional power resources, in terms of bargaining power and worker solidarity, are not firmly established, Use of the legal mobilisation  clearly offers important additional tactics.

See also

References

Activism by type
Practice of law